The following is a list of football stadiums in Moldova.

See also
List of European stadiums by capacity
List of association football stadiums by capacity

References

Football venues in Moldova
Stadiums
Moldova
Football stadiums